The 2017 Campeonato Paraense de Futebol was the 105th edition of Pará's top professional football league. The competition started on 29 January and ended on 7 May. Paysandu won the championship for the 47th time.

Format
The competition will consist of two groups of five teams each, who will face off in round games and back against the other key times in a single turn. The top two will contest the semi-finals in their respective groups, thereby defining the two championship finalists. The losers of the semifinals will make two matches to decide the third place. Semifinal and final matches will round trip.

The worst placed of each group will be relegated to the Second Division.

The champion qualify to the 2018 Copa Verde. The champion, the runner-up and the 3rd-placed team qualify to the 2018 Copa do Brasil. The best two teams who isn't on Campeonato Brasileiro Série A, Série B or Série C qualifies to 2018 Campeonato Brasileiro Série D.

Participating teams

Group stage

Group A1

Group A2

Semi-finals

First leg

Second leg

Third place play-off

Finals

References

Pará
Campeonato Paraense